"I'm Ready" is a song by American singer Tevin Campbell. It was written by Babyface for Campbell's second studio album of the same name while production was helmed by Babyface and Daryl Simmons. Released as the album's second single, it became a success on both the pop and R&B charts, reaching the top-ten in New Zealand and on the US Billboard Hot 100 as well as the top-five on the Hot R&B/Hip-Hop Songs chart. "I'm Ready" was nominated for a Grammy Award for Best Male R&B Vocal Performance at the 37th awards ceremony.

Music video
An accompanying music video for "I'm Ready" was filmed by German film director Marcus Nispel.

Track listings

Notes
 denotes additional producer

Credits and personnel
Credits adapted from liner notes.

Tevin Campbell – lead and background vocals
Babyface – writer, composer, producer, all music and background vocals
Daryl Simmons – producer
Randy Walker – MIDI technician

Jim Zumpano, Donnell Sullivan – recording engineers
Rail Rogut, Steve Warner, Ulrich Wild – assistant engineers
Dave Way – mixing engineer
Ivy Skoff – production coordinator

Charts

Weekly charts

Year-end charts

Certifications and sales

References

1993 songs
1994 singles
Tevin Campbell songs
Songs written by Babyface (musician)
Song recordings produced by Babyface (musician)
Song recordings produced by Daryl Simmons
1990s ballads